Danilo "Danny" Guades is a Filipino spree killer who hacked to death 10 people with a bolo and injured 17 more on a drunken rampage through his neighbourhood in Gadgaran, Calbayog, on June 2, 2007.

Life
Danny Guades was jailed for seven years at the (Abuyao) Caloocan City Jail for stabbing his elder brother Toto to death some time in the 1980s. He had been married, but his wife died in December 2006. After her death, he began to stay at his cousin's house. He had a child, who was in fourth grade at the time of the murders. Throughout the village, Guades was known as a mentally unstable troublemaker who was often drunk, sometimes staying awake for two days, before running to the mangroves to sleep there on the ground for the following two days. Apparently, Guades had also told others that he was being followed by someone.

Murders
Guades began his rampage at the home of his cousin Emily Guades Ponce. Entering her house at about 2 a.m., he attacked her husband Benjamin with a 22-inch long bolo knife, hitting him in the left shoulder, before turning against her sleeping children, killing her son Eric with a blow to the head and injuring her other son Benjie and her daughter Marylin with hits to the head and arms. Emily Guades Ponce, though also suffering head injuries, managed to jump out of a window and escape.

Subsequently, Guades attacked the Jadulco family, who was living nearby, killing pregnant Gemma Jadulco and five of her children and leaving two others injured, before walking to the Conteras' home. There, he killed Candido Conteras, injured his wife Maria, daughter Jennelyn, and mortally wounded their son Danilo. In the backyard of the house, Guades attacked Carlito Layam, who suffered minor injuries to his right arm, but managed to fight off the attacker.

Afterwards, Guades entered the house of Enis Lecis through the window and hit the sleeping Eduardo and Enis Lecis in the head, killing Eduardo and wounding Enis. At a wake for a member of the Ramada family, where Guades had spent some time drinking earlier, he cut Francisco Ramada's throat, hit Ernesto Ramada's neck, and stabbed Armando Ramada in the left side of his body. Michael Caber and Myra Manlapid were also injured before people attending the wake managed to fight Guades off. Guades fled to a road junction, where he attacked his final victims, Eddie and Jocelyn Gonzaga, who were on a motorcycle. Guades assaulted them with the bolo and a club, hitting Eddie Gonzaga in the arm, jaw, and forehead, and his wife in her left elbow, before the driver of the motorcycle was able to escape.

Guades finally surrendered himself to Fortunato Burbana, a villager, at about 3 a.m. He stated that he surrendered, fearing police might chase and kill him. Burbana then turned him over to police, ending Guades' hour-long rampage. At the police station, Guades denied killing anyone but his brother years prior to the rampage. He was charged with multiple murder.

Victims

Deaths

Injured

Motive
It was said that Guades apparently had a quarrel with Gemma Jadulco's husband, Totoy, before the rampage, when both were attending the wake. Police later disclosed that Guades told them he committed the crime to strengthen his amulet, a piece of paper with Latin words on it.

References

External links
Killing Rampage In Calbayog Samar, Tingog.com (June 3, 2007)
Eight killed as amok rampages in Samar, The Manila Times (June 3, 2007)
Deranged man kills 10, hurts 16 in Samar village, Philippine Headline News (June 3, 2007)
Jobless man runs amuck, kills 10 in Samar, Philippine Daily Inquirer (June 3, 2007)
10 killed, 16 wounded as man runs amok in Samar, Philippine Daily Inquirer (June 2, 2007)
Drunk man kills 10 in Philippines, Reuters (June 3, 2007)
Killing spree in Calbayog a wake-up call, say top cops, Leyte Samar Daily Express
Multiple murder charges filed vs amok, Philippine Information Agency (June 5, 2007)

1960s births
Living people
Mass murder in 2007
Filipino mass murderers
Filipino murderers of children
Spree killers
Fratricides
People from Calbayog
Massacres in the Philippines
2007 murders in the Philippines